Henry Shafto Harrison (1810 – 3 July 1892) was a 19th-century Member of Parliament in what was then called "Wanganui", New Zealand.

Background and migration

Harrison was from Yorkshire, and after graduating from Cambridge came to New Zealand with wife and surviving children on the Bolton in 1840. The family lived on St. John's Hill until 1847. Because of local unrest, they moved to a farm near Fordell, which they named "Warrengate" after their Yorkshire heritage. The locality now has a Warrengate Road and a Harrison Road. He was a lover of English sports, notably horse-racing.

Public service 

He fought in the New Zealand Wars. He was on the Wellington Provincial Council before representing Wanganui as an MP.

MP for Wanganui
Harrison was the first winner of the newly created Wanganui electorate in the 1861 general election, but the election was declared irregular. He won the ensuing 1861 by-election, and held it to the end of the term of the 3rd New Zealand Parliament in 1866. John Bryce won the seat in the 1866 general election, but resigned in 1867. Harrison won the subsequent by-election on 27 April 1867. He represented the electorate until the end of the 4th New Zealand Parliament in 1870. He was defeated at the 1871 general election.

References

1810 births
1892 deaths
Members of the New Zealand House of Representatives
Unsuccessful candidates in the 1866 New Zealand general election
Unsuccessful candidates in the 1871 New Zealand general election
New Zealand MPs for North Island electorates
19th-century New Zealand politicians
People from Yorkshire
Members of the Wellington Provincial Council
English emigrants to New Zealand
Sheriffs of New Zealand